The Dark Ocean is a mystery novel by American author Jack Vance, published in 1985 by Underwood-Miller and in 2002 as part of the Vance Integral Edition.

Plot summary

Betty Haverhill, an attractive California girl, takes a coming-of-age sojourn, embarking from San Francisco on an Italian freighter bound for ports in El Salvador, Panama, Venezuela, Spain and Italy. To her dismay, the passengers include Ted Bunpole, an old boyfriend who infuriates her by introducing himself as her "fiancé", a notion of which she immediately disabuses both him and her fellow passengers.

Betty develops an attraction for and engages in a mild flirtation with Mik Finsch, an older, mysterious man-of-the-world, but when she accepts an offer of drinks in his cabin, his amorous advances get out of line and Betty find herself hard put to fend him off. Ted bursts into Finsch's cabin and the two start fighting; by the time the captain breaks them up, Ted has thrashed Finsch, who claims he was "just warming up".

Betty tells Ted she could have handled the situation herself and she still has no interest in marrying him and wished he had not come. Another passenger tells Betty that Finsch's pride has been wounded and he will get revenge on Ted somehow. That night, Ted goes missing and a typewritten suicide note is found. There are suspicions, but no proof. When another "suicide" involving Finsch and the wife of a shipping agent leaves no doubt in Betty's mind that Finsch is a murderer, the two are pitted against one another, with Finsch seemingly holding all the cards.

1985 American novels
Novels by Jack Vance
American mystery novels